Robert England may refer to:

 Robert England (architect) (1863–1908), New Zealand architect
 Robert E. England, professor of political science at Oklahoma State University